The 2022–23 Marist Red Foxes men's basketball team represented Marist College in the 2022–23 NCAA Division I men's basketball season. The Red Foxes, led by fifth-year head coach John Dunne, played their home games at the McCann Arena in Poughkeepsie, New York as members of the Metro Atlantic Athletic Conference.

Previous season
The Red Foxes finished the 2021–22 season 14–16, 9–11 in MAAC play to finish in a tie for fifth place. They were upset by Quinnipiac in the first round of the MAAC tournament.

Roster

Schedule and results

|-
!colspan=12 style=| Non-conference regular season

|-
!colspan=12 style=| MAAC regular season

|-
!colspan=12 style=| MAAC tournament

Sources

References

Marist Red Foxes men's basketball seasons
Marist Red Foxes
Marist Red Foxes men's basketball
Marist Red Foxes men's basketball